Massachusetts House of Representatives' 10th Worcester district in the United States is one of 160 legislative districts included in the lower house of the Massachusetts General Court. It covers parts of Norfolk County and Worcester County. Democrat Brian Murray of Milford has represented the district since 2017.

Towns represented
The district includes the following localities:
 Hopedale
 part of Medway
 Mendon
 Milford

The current district geographic boundary overlaps with those of the Massachusetts Senate's 2nd Middlesex and Norfolk district and Worcester and Norfolk district.

Former locales
The district previously covered:
 Paxton, circa 1872 
 part of the city of Worcester, circa 1872

Representatives
 Charles Brimblecom, circa 1858-1859 
 Rowse Reynolds Clarke, circa 1888 
 George C. F. Hudson, circa 1920 
 Arthur H. Turner, circa 1920 
 Fred Arthur Blake, circa 1951 
 Thomas E. Creighton, circa 1975 
 Salvatore Cimino, January 3, 1979 – January 7, 1981
 Marie Parente, January 7, 1981 – January 3, 2007
 John V. Fernandes, January 3, 2007 – January 4, 2017
 Brian W. Murray, 2017-current

See also
 List of Massachusetts House of Representatives elections
 Other Worcester County districts of the Massachusetts House of Representatives: 1st, 2nd, 3rd, 4th, 5th, 6th, 7th, 8th, 9th, 11th, 12th, 13th, 14th, 15th, 16th, 17th, 18th
 Worcester County districts of the Massachusett Senate: 1st, 2nd; Hampshire, Franklin and Worcester; Middlesex and Worcester; Worcester, Hampden, Hampshire and Middlesex; Worcester and Middlesex; Worcester and Norfolk
 List of Massachusetts General Courts
 List of former districts of the Massachusetts House of Representatives

Images
Portraits of legislators

References

External links
 Ballotpedia
  (State House district information based on U.S. Census Bureau's American Community Survey).

House
Government in Worcester County, Massachusetts
Government of Norfolk County, Massachusetts